The Twenty-fifth Amendment of the Constitution (Protection of Human Life in Pregnancy) Bill 2001 (bill no. 48 of 2001) was a proposed amendment to the Constitution of Ireland to tighten the constitutional ban on abortion. It would have removed the threat of suicide as a grounds for legal abortion in the state, as well as introducing new penalties for anyone performing an abortion, by giving constitutional status to legislation proposed to be enacted after the amendment. It was narrowly rejected in a referendum held on 6 March 2002, with 50.4% against.

Overview

In 1983 the Eighth Amendment introduced a constitutional ban on abortion in Ireland. The X Case in 1992 established the right of Irish women to an abortion if a pregnant woman's life was at risk because of the pregnancy, including from the risk of suicide. Later in 1992, three separate constitutional amendments on the subject of abortion were put to a vote. The Twelfth Amendment Bill, which would have excluded the risk of suicide as grounds for abortion was rejected. The Thirteenth Amendment, which guaranteed freedom of travel to obtain an abortion abroad, and the Fourteenth Amendment, which guaranteed access to information, were both approved.

The Twenty-fifth Amendment was a second attempt to exclude the risk of suicide as grounds for an abortion. It was introduced by the Fianna Fáil–Progressive Democrats coalition government led by Taoiseach Bertie Ahern. The government presented the amendment as one part of a comprehensive package of changes to address the issue of crisis pregnancy. Among other measures it would have removed the threat of suicide as a grounds for legal abortion and also would have introduced new penalties of up to twelve years in jail for those performing or assisting abortions. Along with the government parties, the Catholic Church favoured the proposal. It was opposed by Fine Gael, the Labour Party, the Green Party and Sinn Féin. The proposal was put to a referendum on 6 March 2002 but was narrowly rejected by 629,041 (50.4%) against to 618,485 (49.6%) in favour.

Proposed changes
The Twenty-fifth Amendment was more complex than the proposal that had been rejected in 1992. It provided that abortion would be regulated for by specific legislation that would be named in the text to be added to the Constitution. The legislation, the Protection of Human Life in Pregnancy Act 2002, would be given the same protection as provisions of the Constitution, such that it could be amended only by referendum.

Article 40.3.3º reads

The Twenty-fifth amendment would have ultimately added two sub-sections immediately following, as Article 40.3.4º and 40.3.5º:

The proposed text of 40.3.5º would have ensured that the provisions of Article 46 on Amendments to the Constitution and Article 47 on Referendums would apply to any amendment of this Act.

Proposed Protection of Human Life in Pregnancy Act
The Twenty-fifth Amendment of the Constitution (Protection of Human Life in Pregnancy) Bill 2001 included the text of a proposed Act which would regulate the termination of pregnancy. It would have repealed Sections 58 and 59 of the Offences against the Person Act 1861.

Section 1 defined abortion as "the intentional destruction by any means of unborn human life after implantation in the womb of a woman". It further stated that abortion did not include "the carrying out of a medical procedure by a medical practitioner at an approved place in the course of which or as a result of which unborn human life is ended where that procedure is, in the reasonable opinion of the practitioner, necessary to prevent a real and substantial risk of loss of the woman's life other than by self-destruction". This would have excluded the availability of abortion where there was a risk of life due to suicide.

Section 2 defined abortion as a criminal offence, subject to imprisonment of 12 years or a fine or both.

Section 3 protected conscientious objection.

Section 4 affirmed the freedom to travel and to obtain information about abortion.

Amendment procedure
It was intended that after the passage of the Twenty-fifth Amendment, the Oireachtas would enact the Protection of Human Life in Pregnancy Act. The Amendment proposed to insert a number of temporary provisions in the Constitution to bridge the period between the enactment of the Twenty-fifth Amendment and subsequent enactment of the Protection of Human Life in Pregnancy Act.

The Twenty-fifth Amendment proposed first to add Article 46.5. This section provided that if the Protection of Human Life in Pregnancy Act were enacted, Article 46.5 would be omitted from every official text of the constitution, and the two new Articles 40.3.4º and 40.3.5º detailed above would be inserted. The Act would have to be in the form prescribed in the Schedule to the Amendment Bill. If no action was taken within 180 days then the whole constitutional amendment would cease to have effect. It also provided that the bill for the Protection of Human Life in Pregnancy Act could not be referred by the President to the Supreme Court or to an ordinary referendum (as it would have just received the approval of the voters in a referendum). This conditional form of amendment followed a similar procedure to the amendment of Articles 2 and 3 in 1999 after the passage of the Nineteenth Amendment in 1998.

Passage through the Oireachtas
The Twenty-fifth Amendment of the Constitution (Protection of Human Life in Pregnancy) Bill 2001 was proposed in the Dáil by Minister for Health and Children Micheál Martin on 25 October 2001. It was approved by the Dáil on 5 December 2001:

The Bill was approved by the Seanad on 13 December 2001:

Result
The amendment was then put to a referendum on 6 March 2002, where it was rejected.

Aftermath
No legislation on abortion followed this referendum. Eleven years later, under a coalition government of Fine Gael and the Labour Party, the Protection of Life During Pregnancy Act 2013 was enacted, which provided for abortion in circumstances where there was a real and substantial threat to life of the pregnant woman, including from a risk of suicide.

In 2018, the Thirty-sixth Amendment of the Constitution of Ireland was approved, allowing for abortion.

Opinion polling

See also
Abortion in the Republic of Ireland
Politics of the Republic of Ireland

References

External links
Twenty-fifth Amendment of the Constitution (Protection of Human Life in Pregnancy) Bill 2001 Oireachtas debates and text of bill
Committees - Coistí - 2001 Committee on Health and Children includes committee stage debates of the bill
Full text of the Constitution of Ireland

2002 in Irish law
2002 in Irish politics
2002 referendums
25
25
25
25
March 2002 events in Europe
Amendment, 25